The Merriland River is a  river in southern Maine. It is a tributary of the Little River, a tidal river flowing to the Atlantic Ocean. Its basin country is United States.

The Merriland River rises in the southern corner of Sanford and flows east into Wells, which it crosses to the east border of the town and ends at the Little River.

See also
List of rivers of Maine

References

Maine Streamflow Data from the USGS
Maine Watershed Data From Environmental Protection Agency

Rivers of York County, Maine
Sanford, Maine
Wells, Maine
Rivers of Maine